The Lower Western District is  a subregion of the Colombian Department of Caldas.

Anserma (Capital)
Belalcazar
Risaralda
San José
Viterbo

References 

Subregions of Caldas Department